Roaring Forties is the 21st studio album by Peter Hammill, released on his own Fie! label in 1994. It, and the following album, X My Heart, are Hammill's most recent albums that primarily contain an organic, full-band rock style. While there are occasional tracks on later albums in this style, Hammill's principal mode has moved since this album towards a more intimate, chamber-music style. The Roaring Forties is a name given, especially by sailors, to the latitudes between 40°S and 50°S, so called because of the boisterous and prevailing westerly winds.

The album also contains "A Headlong Stretch", one of Hammill's occasional long, episodic song suites (see also "A Plague of Lighthouse Keepers" from Pawn Hearts and "Flight" from A Black Box).

Track listing
All tracks composed by Peter Hammill
"Sharply Unclear" - 5:42
"The Gift of Fire (Talk Turkey)" - 8:31
"You Can't Want What You Always Get" - 9:36
"A Headlong Stretch" - 19:32
"Up Ahead"
"Continental Drift"
"The Twelve"
"Long Light"
"Backwards Man"
"As You Were"
"Or So I Said"
"Your Tall Ship" - 4:58

Personnel
Peter Hammill - guitar, piano, vocals
Nic Potter - bass on "Sharply Unclear" and "You Can't Want What You Always Get"
Stuart Gordon - violin
Simon Clark - organ on "The Gift of Fire"
David Jackson - saxophone, flute
Manny Elias - drums, percussion

Technical
Peter Hammill - recording engineer, mixing (Terra Incognita, Bath)
Paul Ridout - design, photography

References

Peter Hammill albums
1994 albums